The United States competed at the 2014 Winter Olympics in Sochi, Russia, from February 7 to 23, 2014. Team USA consisted of 222 athletes competing in all 15 sports.

After winning an Olympic record 37 medals at the 2010 Winter Olympics in Vancouver, the United States had a somewhat disappointing performance during these games. Although the delegation ranked second in overall medals with 28, it ranked out of the top three in gold medals (with a total of nine) for the first time since Nagano in 1998 when it placed 6th in overall medals and 5th in gold medals. In figure skating, the U.S. won no medals in the men's or women's singles events for the first time since 1936.

Conversely, at the Sanki Sliding Center, the United States won more medals (seven) than any other nation. Steven Holcomb and Steven Langton won the first U.S. medal (a silver) in two-man bobsled in 62 years, while Erin Hamlin earned the first singles luge medal ever for the United States (also bronze). In skeleton, Noelle Pikus-Pace and Matthew Antoine won silver and bronze respectively, the first U.S. medals in that sport since 2002. Overall, the U.S. won four medals in bobsled events, two in skeleton, and one in luge.

Of the nine gold medals won by Team USA, seven were won by first-time Olympians. In snowboarding, Sage Kotsenburg and Jamie Anderson won gold in the inaugural slopestyle events, and Kaitlyn Farrington won the women's halfpipe.  In freestyle skiing, Joss Christensen won the inaugural men's slopestyle, David Wise won men's halfpipe, and Maddie Bowman won women's halfpipe.  Eighteen-year-old alpine skier Mikaela Shiffrin won gold in the slalom in her Olympic debut. Among returning Olympians, Meryl Davis and Charlie White won the first American gold in ice dancing, and Ted Ligety won gold in giant slalom, becoming the first American man to win two Olympic golds in alpine skiing. Fellow alpine skier Bode Miller, competing in his fifth winter games, became the oldest alpine medalist at age 36, winning bronze in the super-G.

The 2014 Games marked the first time a U.S. Olympic team competed in Russia, as the United States and 65 other countries boycotted the 1980 Summer Olympics held in Moscow due to the Soviet invasion of Afghanistan. President Barack Obama and Vice President Joe Biden did not attend the 2014 Winter Olympics, reportedly to protest against Russia's anti-gay laws. American nordic combined skier Todd Lodwick was the flag bearer of Team USA for the Parade of Nations during the opening ceremony.  Four-time ice hockey Olympian Julie Chu was the flag bearer during the closing ceremonies.

Some results were later amended due to the Russian doping scandal.

Medalists

The following U.S. competitors won medals at the games. In the by discipline sections below, medalists' names are bolded.

 Athletes who participated in preliminary rounds but not the final round.

Alpine skiing

The United States qualified a total quota of 20 athletes in alpine skiing. The full list of the U.S. alpine skiing team was officially announced on January 27, 2014.

Men

Women

Biathlon

Based on their performance at the 2012 and 2013 Biathlon World Championships, the United States qualified five men and five women. The full list of U.S. biathlon team was officially announced on January 12, 2014.

Men

Women

Mixed

Bobsleigh 

Men

* – Denotes the driver of each sled

Women

* – Denotes the driver of each sled

Cross-country skiing

The team was named on January 22, 2014.

Distance
Men

Women

Sprint
Men

Qualification legend: Q – Qualify on position in heat; q – Qualify on time in round

Women

Qualification legend: Q – Qualify on position in heat; q – Qualify on time in round

Curling

Based on results from the 2012 World Women's Curling Championship and the 2013 World Women's Curling Championship, the United States qualified their women's team as one of the seven highest ranked nations. The United States has also qualified their men's team through the Olympic qualification event.

Summary

Men's tournament

Team
The United States men's curling team curled out of the Duluth Curling Club in Duluth, Minnesota.

Round-robin

Draw 2
Monday, February 10, 7:00 pm

Draw 3
Tuesday, February 11, 2:00 pm

Draw 4
Wednesday, February 12, 9:00 am

Draw 6
Thursday, February 13, 2:00 pm

Draw 7
Friday, February 14, 9:00 am

Draw 8
Friday, February 14, 7:00 pm

Draw 10
Sunday, February 16, 9:00 am

Draw 11
Sunday, February 16, 7:00 pm

Draw 12
Monday, February 17, 2:00 pm

Women's tournament

Team
The United States women's curling team curled out of the Madison Curling Club in Madison, Wisconsin.

Round-robin

Draw 1
Monday, February 10, 2:00 pm

Draw 2
Tuesday, February 11, 9:00 am

Draw 3
Tuesday, February 11, 7:00 pm

Draw 4
Wednesday, February 12, 2:00 pm

Draw 6
Thursday, February 13, 7:00 pm

Draw 7
Friday, February 14, 2:00 pm

Draw 9
Saturday, February 15, 7:00 pm

Draw 10
Sunday, February 16, 2:00 pm

Draw 11
Monday, February 17, 9:00 am

Figure skating 

Individual

Mixed

Team

Freestyle skiing

Only 26 of the 34 quota places earned could be filled. The 11 slopestyle and halfpipe skiers who earned their Olympic berths at the qualifying events were named to the team on January 18, 2014, and the rest of the team was named on January 21, 2014.

15-year-old Maggie Voisin originally qualified for the slopestyle event but had to withdraw due to an injury.

Aerials

Freeskiing
Men

Women

Moguls
Men

Women

Ski cross

Qualification legend: FA – Qualify to medal round; FB – Qualify to consolation round

Ice hockey

Summary

Men's tournament

The United States qualified a men's team by being one of the nine highest-ranked teams in the IIHF World Ranking following the 2012 World Championships.

Roster

Preliminary round
The United States was drawn into Group A.

All times are local (UTC+4).

Quarterfinals

Semifinals

Bronze medal game

Women's tournament

The women's team qualified by being one of the five highest-ranked teams in the IIHF World Ranking following the 2012 Women's World Championships.

Roster

Preliminary round
The United States was drawn into Group A.

All times are local (UTC+4).

Semifinals

Gold medal game

Luge

Based on world rankings between November 1, 2013, and December 31, 2013, the United States qualified 10 athletes.

Men

Women

Mixed/Open

Nordic combined

The United States qualified a total of four athletes and a spot in the team relay. The full Nordic combined team was officially announced on January 22, 2014.

Short track speed skating

Based on their performance at World Cup 3 and 4 in November 2013, the United States qualified five men and three women. The members of the team were decided at the US Olympic trials from January 2–5, 2014. Kyle Carr was the fifth man selected to the team, but he did not skate in any individual distances or in the relay.

Men

Women

Qualification legend: ADV – Advanced due to being impeded by another skater; FA – Qualify to medal round; FB – Qualify to consolation round; AA – Advance to medal round due to being impeded by another skater

Skeleton

The skeleton team was named on January 18, 2014.

Ski jumping

The team was named on January 22, 2014.

Men

Women

Snowboarding

The final members of the freestyle team and the alpine team was named on January 21, 2014. The snowboard cross team was named on January 25, 2014.

Freestyle
Men

Qualification Legend: QF – Qualify directly to final; QS – Qualify to semifinal

Women

Qualification Legend: QF – Qualify directly to final; QS – Qualify to semifinal

Parallel

Snowboard cross
Men

Qualification legend: FA – Qualify to medal round; FB – Qualify to consolation round

Women

Qualification legend: FA – Qualify to medal round; FB – Qualify to consolation round

Speed skating

Based on the results from the fall World Cups during the 2013–14 ISU Speed Skating World Cup season, the United States earned start quotas in each distance, and the members of the team were decided following the 2014 U.S. Olympic Long Track Trials from December 27 to January 1. A team of 17 was announced after the trials. This was the first Winter Olympics since 1984 that the American long track speed skating team failed to win an Olympic medal.

Distance
Men

Women

Team pursuit

See also
United States at the 2014 Winter Paralympics
United States at the 2014 Summer Youth Olympics

References

External links

United States at the 2014 Winter Olympics 

Nations at the 2014 Winter Olympics
2014
Winter Olympics